Nausinoe reussi is a species of moth of the family Crambidae described by Max Gaede in 1917. 
It can be found in Tanzania, in eastern Africa.

This species remembers a little Nausinoe geometralis. It has pale-brown wings with white spots and has a wingspan of 18–20 mm. The holotypes were found in Kilwa in German East Africa (today: Tanzania), Dar es Salaam, and Ukerewe Island.

References

Moths described in 1917
Spilomelinae